Noah "Wuv" Bernardo Jr. (born February 24, 1974) is an American musician, most notably the guitarist and drummer for Christian nu metal band P.O.D..

According to a FAQ, Bernardo is Filipino, Italian, German, and Chamorro. He is the first cousin of the band's frontman Sonny Sandoval. His father, Noah Bernardo Sr. started Rescue Records, which was P.O.D.'s first label.

It has been announced that Wuv will be handling drum duties for the band StillWell, a side project of Fieldy, the bassist of metal band Korn. Wuv has been playing drums most of his life. During acoustic sets, he normally plays the rhythm guitar. He also has a side project called Southtown Generals, with Rasta Tim Pacheco. In 2020, Bernardo formed a project called Belle and the Dragon, alongside members of Flyleaf.

Bernardo was the co-owner of the Chula Vista skate shop "The Orphanage"; however, it is no longer in operation.

Discography

P.O.D.
 Snuff the Punk (1994)
 Brown (1996)
 LIVE at Tomfest (1997)
 The Warriors EP (1998)
 The Fundamental Elements of Southtown (1999)
 Satellite (2001)
 Payable on Death (2003)
 The Warriors EP, Volume 2 2005
 Testify (2006)
 Greatest Hits: The Atlantic Years (2006)
 When Angels & Serpents Dance (2008)
 Murdered Love (2012)
 SoCal Sessions (2014)
 The Awakening (2015)
 Circles (2018)

Southtown Generals
 Southtown Generals (2010)

StillWell
 Surrounded by Liars EP (2011)
 Dirtbag (2011)
 Raise It Up (2015)
 Supernatural Miracle (2020)

Other appearances
 "A Song for Chi" (2009)

References

1974 births
Living people
American heavy metal drummers
American musicians of Filipino descent
American people of German descent
American people of Italian descent
American performers of Christian music
American people of Chamorro descent
Chicano rock musicians
American rock drummers
20th-century American drummers
American male drummers
21st-century American drummers
20th-century American male musicians
21st-century American male musicians
StillWell members
P.O.D. members